The greenbrier leaf miner (Leucoptera smilaciella) is a moth in the Lyonetiidae family. It is known from the United States, from Pennsylvania to Florida and Texas.

The larvae feed on Smilax species. They mine the leaves of their host plant. The mine has the form of a large, messy blotch.

References

Leucoptera (moth)
Leaf miners
Moths described in 1900
Moths of North America